Tselina is a Russian military space-based radio surveillance system, originally developed in the former Soviet Union. It is capable of determining the exact location of radio-emitting objects and also their type, modes of operation, and how active they are. For instance, preparation for a military operation may raise the activity of the radio communications. Detection of these communications by a space-based surveillance system can provide early warning of this activity, warning that may be unavailable by other means.

Variants 
Initially divided into "overview" (Tselina-O) and "detailed" (Tselina-D), since about 1980 the system has been integrated into a single satellite, Tselina-P, which is also known as Tselina-2. The system's primary subject is enemy radar equipment. Tselina has been numbered as part of the Kosmos series. In total 130 Tselina satellites have been launched.

 Tselina-O satellites were launched using Kosmos-3M rockets.
 Tselina-D used the Vostok-2M and later the Tsyklon-3.
 Four upgraded Tselina-Ds, named Tselina-R, were also launched using the Tsyklon.
 Tselina-2 satellites were designed for launch on Zenit-2 launch vehicles, however the first two launches used the larger Proton-K / DM-2 as the Zenit was still undergoing development. The most recent launch used the modernised Zenit-2M launch vehicle.

References 

Reconnaissance satellites of the Soviet Union
Reconnaissance satellites of Russia
Signals intelligence satellites
Military equipment introduced in the 1970s